The Akizuki class of destroyers of the Japan Maritime Self-Defense Force is intended to escort the  and  helicopter destroyers, and safeguard the other Aegis-capable warships such as the  and . The destroyer provides defense against surface, airborne and undersea threats. The class was initially designated as "19DD", referring to a date on the Japanese calendar, specifically the 19th fiscal year of the Heisei period (2007).

Design

The hull structure was based on the one of the Takanami-class destroyers. There are many small improvements, such as cleaner lines to reduce the radar signature and decoys for torpedoes; but the principal changes can be summed up as more powerful engines, sensors, sonar and the indigenous ATECS battle management system that has been called the Japanese AEGIS. The main gas turbine engines are standardized on a higher-powered version of the Rolls-Royce Spey SM1C, in contrast to the combination of Rolls-Royce SM1C and General Electric LM2500 turbines used in the Takanami class.

Equipment
Main features of the class include enhanced C4ISR and Anti-Aircraft Warfare (AAW) capability, with an OYQ-11 advanced Combat Direction Sub-system (CDS) and FCS-3A AAW weapon sub-system.

OYQ-11
This is the first CDS adopting a fully distributed computing architecture to be implemented in general-purpose destroyers of the JMSDF. AN/UYQ-70 workstations form the basic computing platform, with Link 16 datalinks. In addition to the CDS, this class is equipped with SATCOM terminals linked to Superbird satellites, part of the Maritime Operation Force (MOF) system. The MOF system is the operational C4I system used in the fleet of the JMSDF, based on the ILOG architecture and interoperable with other JSDF forces. There are also USC-42 DAMA terminals for GCCS-M, the American counterpart of the MOF system.

FCS-3A
This is a domestically developed AAW combat system. It consists of two main components, one is a dual-band and multimode active electronically scanned array radar, and the other is the fire-control system. An ESSM SAM VLS is integrated with the FCS-3A.
Anti-submarine and Electronic Warfare (EW) capabilities of the Akizuki class have been enhanced, with a new OQQ-22 integrated sonar suite sub-system (hull-sonar and OQR-3 towed array; - a Japanese equivalent of the American AN/SQQ-89), and the NOLQ-3D digitalized EW suite sub-system. These sub-systems communicate across a NOYQ-1B wide area network.

Gallery

Ships in the class

References

External links

Ministry of Defense  (2006 Prior enterprise evaluation) (Japanese)
Summary
Reference
Prior evaluation note

 
Destroyer classes
Ships built by Mitsubishi Heavy Industries
Articles containing video clips